Olga Sergeevna Poryadina is a former Russian football defender, who last played for Mordovochka Saransk in the Russian women's football championship. She previously played for Energiya Voronezh, Kubanochka Krasnodar, Lada Togliatti and Rossiyanka Krasnoarmeysk, winning five championships with Energiya, Lada and Rossiyanka.

She has been a member of the Russian national team, and took part in the 2009 European Championship.

Coaching career
In 2020 she became the first head coach of the newly formed women's team of FC Zenit Saint Petersburg.

References

1980 births
Living people
Russian women's footballers
Russia women's international footballers
FC Energy Voronezh players
Kubanochka Krasnodar players
FC Lada Togliatti (women) players
WFC Rossiyanka players
Women's association football defenders
Russian Women's Football Championship players